Ivanas Stapovičius (born July 14, 1980 in Vilnius) is a retired boxer from Lithuania. He represented his native country at the 2000 Summer Olympics in Sydney, Australia, where he lost in the quarterfinals of the men's lightflyweight division (– 48 kg) to North Korea's eventual bronze medalist Kim Un-Chol.

References
sports-reference

1980 births
Living people
Flyweight boxers
Boxers at the 2000 Summer Olympics
Olympic boxers of Lithuania
Sportspeople from Vilnius
Lithuanian male boxers